Union Township is one of the sixteen townships of Belmont County, Ohio, United States. The 2010 census found 2,295 people in the township, 1,992 of whom lived in the unincorporated portions of the township.

Geography
Located in the central part of the county, it borders the following townships:
Flushing Township - northwest
Goshen Township - south
Kirkwood Township - west
Richland Township - east
Wheeling Township - northeast

The village of Morristown is located in central Union Township, and the unincorporated community of Lafferty lies in the township's northeast.

Name and history
Union Township was established in 1804.

It is one of twenty-seven Union Townships statewide.

In 1833, Union Township contained several flouring mills, saw mills, fulling mills, and carding machines.

Government
The township is governed by a three-member board of trustees, who are elected in November of odd-numbered years to a four-year term beginning on the following January 1. Two are elected in the year after the presidential election and one is elected in the year before it. There is also an elected township fiscal officer, who serves a four-year term beginning on April 1 of the year after the election, which is held in November of the year before the presidential election. Vacancies in the fiscal officership or on the board of trustees are filled by the remaining trustees.

References

External links
County website

Townships in Belmont County, Ohio
Townships in Ohio
1804 establishments in Ohio